Vitaliy Ivanovich Lytvynenko (born March 3, 1970), is a Ukrainian retired professional ice hockey player. He played for multiple teams in both Ukraine and Russia during his career, which lasted from 1987 until 2015. He played internationally for the Ukrainian national team at several World Championships, as well as the 2002 Winter Olympics.

Career statistics

Regular season and playoffs

International

External links
 

1970 births
Living people
Bilyi Bars Bila Tserkva players
HC Lada Togliatti players
HK Gomel players
HK Vityaz Kharkiv players
Ice hockey players at the 2002 Winter Olympics
Kompanion Kiev players
Lokomotiv Yaroslavl players
Olympic ice hockey players of Ukraine
Sokil Kyiv players
Soviet ice hockey right wingers
Sportspeople from Kharkiv
Torpedo Nizhny Novgorod players
Ukrainian ice hockey coaches
Ukrainian ice hockey right wingers